Marasmius sullivantii is a species of fungus in the family Marasmiaceae. The species was originally described by the French botanist Jean Pierre François Camille Montagne in 1856.

References

External links

Fungi described in 1856
Fungi of North America
sullivantii
Taxa named by Camille Montagne